Martín Mendaro (born 1 August 1973, in Montevideo) is a former Uruguayan rugby union player and a current coach. He played as a centre.

He played for Carrasco Polo Club in the Campeonato Uruguayo de Rugby.

He had 47 caps for Uruguay, from 1992 to 2003, scoring 4 tries, 20 points on aggregate. He was called for the 1999 Rugby World Cup, playing in two games, without scoring. He would be called once again for the 2003 Rugby World Cup, where he played in three games, remaining scoreless.
 
After finishing his player career, he became a coach. He was first head coach at Carrasco Polo Club, joining Trébol Paysandú in 2017/18, where he won the Campeonato Uruguayo de Rugby the same season.

References

External links
Martín Mendaro International Statistics

1973 births
Living people
Uruguayan rugby union players
Uruguay international rugby union players
Uruguayan rugby union coaches
Rugby union centres
Rugby union players from Montevideo